VfR Aalen are a German football club which are based in Aalen. During the 2013/14 campaign they will be competing in the 2. Bundesliga, DFB-Pokal.

Competitions

2. Bundesliga

References

VfR Aalen seasons
Aalen